The 2019 Santiago ePrix (formally the 2019 Antofagasta Minerals Santiago E-Prix) was a Formula E electric car race held at the Parque O'Higgins Circuit in the Parque O'Higgins of Santiago, Chile on 27 January 2019. It was the third round of the 2018–19 Formula E season and the second annual edition of the event. Sam Bird won the 36 lap race, with Pascal Wehrlein finishing second, in what was his 2nd race in the championship, while Daniel Abt came home in third place. Following the race, Bird led the championship, edging out Jerome d'Ambrosio by 2 points.

Report

Background 
The 2019 Santiago ePrix was confirmed to be taking place as part of the 2018-19 FIA ABB Formula E Championship, on 9 October 2018, with a new circuit in Parque O'Higgins, replacing the previous track in the Parque Forestal following opposition from residents. The new Parque O'Higgins Circuit layout was also revealed on the day itself, with it being planned to be a 2.4 km long track, subjected to FIA Homologation. The track utilised roads in the Parque O'Higgins, with feedback from local residents being sought to minimize any disruption to them during the race. Ultimately, the track was successfully homologated according to its original design. Ahead of the race, a layer of new asphalt was laid in the park in November 2018, with parts of the circuit using the new surface, while the rest including the start/finish straight, was an old concrete layer.

Practice 
Lucas di Grassi topped the timesheets in what was an interrupted Free Practice 1 at Santiago, with running halted midway by a red flag, following a crash by Season 2 champion, Sebastien Buemi. Di Grassi posted a best time of 1:08.630 on a 250 kW run in the closing stages of FP1 to go 0.146 seconds quicker than Pascal Wehrlein's Mahindra, with Sam Bird coming in 3rd for Envision Virgin Racing, 0.358 seconds behind Di Grassi, with his Virgin teammate Frijns coming in at just 0.071 seconds behind him. Reigning Champion Jean-Eric Vergne came in P5, while Ad Diriyah race winner, Antonio Felix Da Costa came in P6. All 22 drivers set flying laps, with the top 11 separated by less than a second. The most serious incident of the session came for Buemi with a crash at Turn 7. The red flag was brought out for 17 minutes, suspending the session, while Buemi's Nissan was retrieved, and subsequently, the session was extended by ten minutes to compensate for some of the lost time.

In Free Practice 2, José María López would lead a pack of 3 Audi-powered cars after the 30-minute session, with him setting a best time of 1:08.194 in his Dragon Racing Penske EV-3, going just 0.066 seconds quicker than Robin Frijns in his customer Envision Virgin Racing Audi. Frijns's Virgin teammate Sam Bird was classified fourth, behind the factory Audi of Lucas di Grassi in third. The session was free of any major incidents, although some drivers, including rookie driver Felipe Massa, went into the run-off area around the track, whilst Andre Lotterer made brief contact with the tire wall. Sebastien Buemi managed to get back out on track after a crash in Free Practice 1 and finished the session 15th in his Nissan. All 22 drivers set flying laps in what was a tightly contested session, with the top 17 covered by a little over 0.7 seconds.

Qualifying 

Lucas di Grassi had been set to start the race from pole position after the Audi Sport ABT Schaeffler driver went quickest by a considerable margin in Super Pole, posting a time of 1:08.290 to go 0.526 seconds clear of Sebastien Buemi in an uncharacteristically spaced-out Super Pole session. It would have marked the second consecutive pole for Audi-powered cars in Season Five of the ABB FIA Formula E Championship after Sam Bird's pole run in Marrakech for customer team Envision Virgin Racing. However, Sebastien Buemi inherited pole position for the race, after di Grassi was penalized following a stewards’ investigation into his brake usage on his in-lap after his group qualifying run. Di Grassi was found to have used the brakes on his Audi e-tron FE05 more during the in-lap than on the flying lap, violating a new rule that was introduced prior to the race concerning brake usage, believed to have been brought in following Tom Dillmann’s brake failure in Marrakesh, which resulted in his parc ferme collision with Robin Frijns. The Audi Sport ABT Schaeffler driver therefore had his qualifying times deleted, including his pole-setting Super Pole time, and will start from the back of the grid. As such, all drivers were promoted by 1 spot, with Pascal Wehrlein qualifying third, ahead of di Grassi's teammate Daniel Abt, while Bird made it three Audis in Super Pole, qualifying fourth and fifth place on the grid went to Stoffel Vandoorne for Venturi.

Several leading drivers failed to make it through to Super Pole, including reigning champion Jean-Eric Vergne who complained about the qualifying format on the live stream, owing to the disadvantaged track conditions for the Group 1 drivers.

Race 

Sam Bird successfully defended from Pascal Wehrlein to win the Santiago ePrix, scoring his first ABB FIA Formula E Championship win since Rome the previous season. While Bird was forced to nurse his Audi e-tron FE05 home with low energy levels on the final lap, he also benefited from Wehrlein also being forced to slow down to prevent overheating on his Mahindra M5Electro, due to the high ambient temperatures at the race, which saw temperatures peak at 38.0°C. While Bird's victory was briefly uncertain following the race, as he faced an investigation for his car possibly being underweight, it was later quickly clarified that no further action would be taken. This win meant of continuation Bird's streak of winning at least one race in every Formula E season, and bringing him into the championship lead, overtaking Marrakesh winner Jerome d'Ambrosio by a point. d'Ambrosio's Mahindra Racing teammate Pascal Wehrlein held on, to finish runner-up in his second Formula E race after using his attack mode to pressure Bird for the lead in the last six minutes. Alexander Sims had appeared set to make it two rookie drivers on the podium, but was given a drive-through penalty which was later converted to a post-race time penalty, for causing a collision with Edoardo Mortara earlier in the race, dropping him back to eighth. As a result of the penalty, Daniel Abt was promoted up to third position, making it two Audis cars finishing on the podium, ahead of Edoardo Mortara in fourth and Bird's Envision Virgin teammate Robin Frijns completing the top five. Mitch Evans took sixth for Jaguar,  while D’Ambrosio finished eighth after a difficult weekend for the Belgian which saw him qualify near the back of the field on account of running in the disadvantaged first qualifying group. Oliver Turvey ending up ninth for NIO, while José María López, who had finished seventh on the road was dropped down to 10th for exceeding maximum power. Nelson Piquet Jr. finished 11th, while Abt's teammate, Lucas di Grassi wound up 12th in the final order after a 10-second stop-and-go penalty was converted into a post-race time penalty, for causing a collision with Lopez. 

It was a race of attrition, which saw only 14 of 22 cars which started the race finishing, following a number of collisions between drivers and technical issues worsened by the hot weather conditions. Among the retirees were Antonio Felix da Costa, who won the opening race of the season in Ad Diriyah, and reigning champion Jean-Eric Vergne, with both drivers colliding on the final corner on lap 8, as well as race polesitter Sebastien Buemi. Buemi had led the race from pole position but crashed out from the lead during the second half when he locked up at the chicane, which forced him to limp home to the pits, and ultimately retire due to the damage sustained to the car.

Classification

Qualifying 

Notes
  — Lucas Di Grassi was demoted to the back of the grid for brake infringement.
  — Stoffel Vandoorne had all of his lap times deleted for missing the red light at the pit exit during Super Pole session.

Race 

  — Alexander Sims received a drive through penalty converted into a 19-second time penalty for causing a collision
  — José María López received a drive through penalty converted into a 19-second time penalty for exceeding power usages
  — Jérôme d'Ambrosio received 5-second time penalty for over speeding under Full Course Yellow
  — Lucas di Grassi received a 10-second stop and go penalty converted into a 34-second time penalty for causing a collision
  — André Lotterer received 5-second time penalty for overtaking under Yellow Flag
  — Fastest lap.
  — Pole position.

Standings after the race 

Drivers' Championship standings

Teams' Championship standings

References 

|- style="text-align:center"
|width="35%"|Previous race:2019 Marrakesh ePrix
|width="30%"|FIA Formula E Championship2018–19 season
|width="35%"|Next race:2019 Mexico City ePrix
|- style="text-align:center"
|width="35%"|Previous race:2018 Santiago ePrix
|width="30%"|Santiago ePrix
|width="35%"|Next race:2020 Santiago ePrix
|- style="text-align:center"

Santiago ePrix
Santiago ePrix
Santiago ePrix
Santiago ePrix